A rain shadow is an area of significantly reduced rainfall behind a mountainous region, on the side facing away from prevailing winds, known as its leeward side.

Evaporated moisture from water bodies (such as oceans and large lakes) is carried by the prevailing onshore breezes towards the drier and hotter inland areas.  When encountering elevated landforms, the moist air is driven upslope towards the peak, where it expands, cools, and its moisture condenses and starts to precipitate.  If the landforms are tall and wide enough, most of the humidity will be lost to precipitation over the windward side (also known as the rainward side) before ever making it past the top. As the air descends the leeward side of the landforms, it is compressed and heated, producing foehn winds that absorb moisture downslope and cast a broad "shadow" of dry climate region behind the mountain crests. This climate typically takes the form of shrub–steppe, xeric shrublands or even deserts.

The condition exists because warm moist air rises by orographic lifting to the top of a mountain range. As atmospheric pressure decreases with increasing altitude, the air has expanded and adiabatically cooled to the point that the air reaches its adiabatic dew point (which is not the same as its constant pressure dew point commonly reported in weather forecasts). At the adiabatic dew point, moisture condenses onto the mountain and it precipitates on the top and windward sides of the mountain. The air descends on the leeward side, but due to the precipitation it has lost much of its moisture. Typically, descending air also gets warmer because of adiabatic compression (as with foehn winds) down the leeward side of the mountain, which increases the amount of moisture that it can absorb and creates an arid region.

Regions of notable rain shadow
There are regular patterns of prevailing winds found in bands round Earth's equatorial region. The zone designated the trade winds is the zone between about 30° N and 30° S, blowing predominantly from the northeast in the Northern Hemisphere and from the southeast in the Southern Hemisphere. The westerlies are the prevailing winds in the middle latitudes between 30 and 60 degrees latitude, blowing predominantly from the southwest in the Northern Hemisphere and from the northwest in the Southern Hemisphere. Some of the strongest westerly winds in the middle latitudes can come in the Roaring Forties of the Southern Hemisphere, between 30 and 50 degrees latitude.

Examples of notable rain shadowing include:

Africa

Northern Africa

 The Sahara is made even drier because of two strong rain shadow effects caused by major mountain ranges (whose highest points can culminate to more than 4,000 meters high). To the northwest, the Atlas Mountains, covering the Mediterranean coast for Morocco, Algeria and Tunisia as well as to the southeast with the Ethiopian Highlands, located in Ethiopia around the Horn of Africa. On the windward side of the Atlas Mountains, the warm, moist winds blowing from the northwest off the Atlantic Ocean which contain a lot of water vapor are forced to rise, lift up and expand over the mountain range. This causes them to cool down, which causes an excess of moisture to condense into high clouds and results in heavy precipitation over the mountain range. This is known as orographic rainfall and after this process, the air is dry because it has lost most of its moisture over the Atlas Mountains. On the leeward side, the cold, dry air starts to descend and to sink and compress, making the winds warm up. This warming causes the moisture to evaporate, making clouds disappear. This prevents rainfall formation and creates desert conditions in the Sahara. The same phenomenon occurs in the Ethiopian Highlands, but this rain shadow effect is even more pronounced because this mountain range is larger, with the tropical Monsoon of South Asia coming from the Indian Ocean and from the Arabian Sea. These produce clouds and rainfall on the windward side of the mountains, but the leeward side stays rain shadowed and extremely dry. This second extreme rain shadow effect partially explains the extreme aridity of the eastern Sahara Desert, which is the driest and the sunniest place on the planet.
 Desert regions in the Horn of Africa (Ethiopia, Eritrea, Somalia and Djibouti) such as the Danakil Desert are all influenced by the air heating and drying produced by rain shadow effect of the Ethiopian Highlands, too.

Southern Africa

 The windward side of the island of Madagascar, which sees easterly on-shore winds, is wet tropical, while the western and southern sides of the island lie in the rain shadow of the central highlands and are home to thorn forests and deserts. The same is true for the island of Réunion.
 On Tristan da Cunha, Sandy Point on the east coast is warmer and drier than the rainy, windswept settlement of Edinburgh of the Seven Seas in the west.

Asia

Central and Northern Asia
 The Himalaya and connecting ranges also contribute to arid conditions in Central Asia including Mongolia's Gobi desert, as well as the semi-arid steppes of Mongolia and north-central to north western China.
 The Verkhoyansk Range in eastern Siberia is the coldest place in the Northern Hemisphere, because the moist southeasterly winds from the Pacific Ocean lose their moisture over the coastal mountains well before reaching the Lena River valley, due to the intense Siberian High forming around the very cold continental air during the winter. One effect in the Sakha Republic (Yakutia) is that, in Yakutsk, Verkhoyansk, and Oymyakon, the average temperature in the coldest month is below . These regions are synonymous with extreme cold.

Eastern Asia
 The Ordos Desert is rain shadowed by mountain chains including the Kara-naryn-ula, the Sheitenula, and the Yin Mountains, which link on to the south end of the Great Khingan Mountains.
 The plains around Tokyo, Japan - known as Kanto plain - in the winter months experiences significantly less precipitation than the rest of the country by virtue of surrounding mountain ranges, including the Japanese Alps, blocking prevailing northwesterly winds originating in Siberia.

Southern Asia

 The eastern side of the Sahyadri ranges on the Deccan Plateau including: North Karnataka and Solapur, Beed, Osmanabad, the Vidharba Plateau and the eastern side of Kerala and western Tamil Nadu in India.
 Gilgit and Chitral, Pakistan, are rainshadow areas.
 The Thar Desert is bounded and rain shadowed by the Aravalli ranges to the southeast, the Himalaya to the northeast, and the Kirthar and Sulaiman ranges to the west.

Western Asia

 The peaks of the Caucasus Mountains to the west and Hindukush and Pamir to the east rain shadow the Karakum and Kyzyl Kum deserts east of the Caspian Sea, as well as the semi-arid Kazakh Steppe. They also cause vast rainfall differences between coastal areas on the Black Sea such as Rize, Batumi and Sochi contrasted with the dry lowlands of Azerbaijan facing the Caspian Sea.
 The semi-arid Anatolian Plateau is rain shadowed by mountain chains, including the Pontic Mountains in the north and the Taurus Mountains in the south.
 The High Peaks of Mount Lebanon rain-shadow the northern parts of the Beqaa Valley and Anti-Lebanon Mountains.
 The Judaean Desert, the Dead Sea and the western slopes of the Moab Mountains on the opposite (Jordanian) side are rain-shadowed by the Judaean Mountains.
 The Dasht-i-Lut in Iran is in the rain shadow of the Elburz and Zagros Mountains and is one of the most lifeless areas on Earth.
 The peaks of the Zagros mountains rain-shadow the northern half of the West Azerbaijan province in Iranian Azerbaijan (above Urmia), as manifested by the province's dry winters relative to those in the windward part of the region (i.e. Kurdistan Region and Hakkâri Province in Turkey).

Europe

Central Europe
 The Plains of Limagne and Forez in the northern Massif Central, France are also relatively rainshadowed (mostly the plain of Limagne, shadowed by the Chaîne des Puys (up to 2000 mm of rain a year on the summits and below 600mm at Clermont-Ferrand, which is one of the driest places in the country).
 The Piedmont wine region of northern Italy is rainshadowed by the mountains that surround it on nearly every side: Asti receives only 527 mm of precipitation per year, making it one of the driest places in mainland Italy.
 Some valleys in the inner Alps are also strongly rainshadowed by the high surrounding mountains: the areas of Gap and Briançon in France, the district of Zernez in Switzerland.
The Kuyavia and the eastern part of the Greater Poland has an average rainfall of about 450 mm because of rainshadowing by the slopes of the Kashubian Switzerland, making it one of the driest places in the North European Plain.

Northern Europe
 The Pennines of Northern England, the mountains of Wales, the Lake District and the Highlands of Scotland create a rain shadow that includes most of the eastern United Kingdom, due to the prevailing south-westerly winds. Manchester and Glasgow, for example, receive around double the rainfall of Sheffield and Edinburgh respectively (although there are no mountains between Edinburgh and Glasgow). The contrast is even stronger further north, where Aberdeen gets around a third of the rainfall of Fort William or Skye. In Devon, rainfall at Princetown on Dartmoor is almost three times the amount received   to the east at locations such as Exeter and Teignmouth. The Fens of East Anglia receive similar rainfall amounts to Seville.
 Iceland has plenty of microclimates courtesy of the mountainous terrain. Akureyri on a northerly fiord receives about a third of the precipitation that the island of Vestmannaeyjar off the south coast gets. The smaller island is in the pathway of Gulf Stream rain fronts with mountains lining the southern coast of the mainland.
Further east, the partial influence of the Scandinavian Mountains contribute to areas in east-central Sweden around Stockholm only receiving  annually. In the north, the mountain range extending to the coast in around Narvik and Tromsø cause a lot higher precipitation there than in coastal areas further east facing north such as Alta or inland areas like Kiruna across the Swedish border.
Combined with the high pressure of the Baltic Sea, this leads to some of the driest climates in the humid zones of Northern Europe being found in the triangle between the coastal areas in the counties of Kalmar, Östergötland and Södermanland along with the offshore island of Gotland on the leeward side of the slopes. Coastal areas in this part of Sweden usually receive less precipitation than windward locations in Andalusia in the south of Spain.

Southern Europe

 The Cantabrian Mountains form a sharp divide between "Green Spain" to the north and the dry central plateau. The northern-facing slopes receive heavy rainfall from the Bay of Biscay, but the southern slopes are in rain shadow. The other most evident effect on the Iberian Peninsula occurs in the Almería, Murcia and Alicante areas, each with an average rainfall of 300 mm, which are the driest spots in Europe (see Cabo de Gata) mostly a result of the mountain range running through their western side, which blocks the westerlies.
 The eastern part of the Pyrenean mountains in the south of France (Cerdagne).
 In the Northern Apennines of Italy, Mediterranean city La Spezia receives twice the rainfall of Adriatic city Rimini on the eastern side.
 The valley of the Vardar River and south from Skopje to Athens is in the rain shadow of the Prokletije and Pindus Mountains.

North America

Caribbean
This is most apparent in Cuba, where this phenomenon leads to the Cuban cactus scrub ecoregion, and the island of Hispaniola (which contains the Caribbean's highest mountain ranges), which results in xeric semi-arid shrublands throughout the Dominican Republic and Haiti.

Northern America

 On the largest scale, the entirety of the North American Interior Plains are shielded from the prevailing Westerlies carrying moist Pacific weather by the North American Cordillera. More pronounced effects are observed, however, in particular valley regions within the Cordillera, in the direct lee of specific mountain ranges. Most rainshadows in the western United States are due to the Sierra Nevada and Cascades ranges.
 The deserts of the Basin and Range Province in the United States and Mexico, which includes the dry areas east of the Cascade Mountains of Oregon and Washington and the Great Basin, which covers almost all of Nevada and parts of Utah are rain shadowed.
 The east slopes of the Coast Ranges in central and southern California also cut off the southern San Joaquin Valley from enough precipitation to ensure desert-like conditions in areas around Bakersfield.
 San Jose, and adjacent cities are usually drier than the rest of the San Francisco Bay Area because of the rain shadow cast by the highest part of the Santa Cruz Mountains.
 The Dungeness Valley around Sequim, Washington lies in the rain shadow of the Olympic Mountains. The area averages 10–15 inches of rain per year, less than half of the amount received in nearby Port Angeles and approximately 10% of that which falls in Forks on the western side of the mountains. To a lesser extent, this rain shadow extends to other parts of the eastern Olympic Peninsula, Whidbey Island, and parts of the San Juan Islands and southeastern Vancouver Island around Victoria, British Columbia. 
 The Mojave, Black Rock, Sonoran, and Chihuahuan deserts all are in regions which are rain shadowed.
 The Owens Valley in the United States, behind the Sierra Nevada range in California.
 Death Valley in the United States, behind both the Pacific Coast Ranges of California and the Sierra Nevada range, is the driest place in North America and one of the driest places on the planet. This is also due to its location well below sea level which tends to cause high pressure and dry conditions to dominate due to the greater weight of the atmosphere above.
 The Colorado Front Range is limited to precipitation that crosses over the Continental Divide. Thus, the Continental Divide acts as a barrier for precipitation. This effect applies only to storms traveling west-to-east. When low pressure systems skirt the Rocky Mountains and approach from the south, they can generate high precipitation on the eastern side and little or none on the western slope.
 The Shenandoah Valley of Virginia, wedged between the Ridge-and-Valley Appalachians and the Blue Ridge Mountains and partially shielded from moisture from the west and southeast, is much drier than the very humid remainder of Virginia and the American Southeast.
 Asheville, North Carolina sits in the rain shadow of the Balsam, Smoky, and Blue Ridge Mountains.
 Ashcroft, British Columbia, the only true desert in Canada, sits in the rain shadow of the Coast Mountains of Canada.
 Yellowknife, the capital and most populous city in the Northwest Territories of Canada, is located in the rain shadow of the mountain ranges to the west of the city.

Oceania

Australia

 In New South Wales and the Australian Capital Territory, Monaro is shielded by both the Snowy Mountains to the northwest and coastal ranges to the southeast. Consequently, parts of it are as dry as the wheat-growing lands of those states. For comparison, Cooma receives  of rain annually, whereas Batlow, on the western side of the ranges, receives  of precipitation. In the cool season, the Great Dividing Range also shields much of the southeast coast (i.e. Sydney, the Central Coast, the Hunter Valley, Illawarra, the South Coast) from south-westerly polar blasts that originate from the Southern Ocean. 
 In Queensland, the land west of Atherton Tableland in the Tablelands Region lies on a rain shadow and therefore would feature significantly lower annual rainfall averages than those in the Cairns Region. For comparison, Tully, which is on the eastern side of the tablelands, towards the coast, receives annual rainfall that exceeds , whereas Mareeba, which lies on the rain shadow of the Atherton Tableland, receives  of rainfall annually.
 In Tasmania, one of the states of Australia, the central Midlands region is in a strong rain shadow and receives only about a fifth as much rainfall as the highlands to the west.
 In Victoria, the western side of Port Phillip Bay is in the rain shadow of the Otway Ranges. The area between Geelong and Werribee is the driest part of southern Victoria: the crest of the Otway Ranges receives  of rain per year and has myrtle beech rainforests much further west than anywhere else, whilst the area around Little River receives as little as  annually, which is as little as Nhill or Longreach and supports only grassland.
 Western Australia's Wheatbelt and Great Southern regions are shielded by the Darling Range to the west: Mandurah, near the coast, receives about  annually. Dwellingup, 40 km inland and in the heart of the ranges, receives over  a year while Narrogin,  further east, receives less than  a year.

Pacific Islands
 Hawaii also has rain shadows, with some areas being desert. Orographic lifting produces the world's second-highest annual precipitation record, 12.7 meters (500 inches), on the island of Kauai; the leeward side is understandably rain-shadowed. The entire island of Kahoolawe lies in the rain shadow of Maui's East Maui Volcano.
 New Caledonia lies astride the Tropic of Capricorn, between 19° and 23° south latitude. The climate of the islands is tropical, and rainfall is brought by trade winds from the east. The western side of the Grande Terre lies in the rain shadow of the central mountains, and rainfall averages are significantly lower.
 In the South Island of New Zealand is to be found one of the most remarkable rain shadows anywhere on Earth. The Southern Alps intercept moisture coming off the Tasman Sea, precipitating about 6,300 mm (250 in) to 8,900 mm (350 in) liquid water equivalent per year and creating large glaciers on the western side. To the east of the Southern Alps, scarcely 50 km (30 mi) from the snowy peaks, yearly rainfall drops to less than 760 mm (30 in) and some areas less than 380 mm (15 in). (see Nor'west arch for more on this subject).

South America

 The Atacama Desert in Chile is the driest non-polar desert on Earth because it is blocked from moisture on both sides (the Andes Mountains to the east block moist Amazon basin air while the Chilean Coast Range stops the oceanic influence from coming in from the west).
 Cuyo and Eastern Patagonia is rain shadowed from the prevailing westerly winds by the Andes range and is arid. The aridity of the lands next to eastern piedmont of the Andes decreases to the south due to a decrease in the height of the Andes with the consequence that the Patagonian Desert develop more fully at the Atlantic coast contributing to shaping the climatic pattern known as the Arid Diagonal. The Argentinian wine region of Cuyo and Northern Patagonia is almost completely dependent on irrigation, using water drawn from the many rivers that drain glacial ice from the Andes. 
 The Guajira Peninsula in northern Colombia is in the rain shadow of the Sierra Nevada de Santa Marta and despite its tropical latitude is almost arid, receiving almost no rainfall for seven to eight months of the year and being incapable of cultivation without irrigation.

See also 
Lake-effect snow
Orographic precipitation
Wind shadow

References

External links
USA Today on rain shadows
Weather pages on rain shadows

Land surface effects on climate
Mountain meteorology
Hydrology